The following is a list of lists of characters who appear in a variety of Gundam series arranged based on order of release dates.

 List of Mobile Suit Gundam characters
 List of Mobile Suit Zeta Gundam characters
 List of Mobile Suit Gundam ZZ characters
 List of Mobile Suit Victory Gundam characters
 List of Mobile Fighter G Gundam characters
 List of Mobile Suit Gundam Wing characters
 List of After War Gundam X characters
 List of Turn A Gundam characters
 List of Mobile Suit Gundam SEED characters
 List of Mobile Suit Gundam SEED Astray characters
 List of Mobile Suit Gundam 00 characters
 List of Mobile Suit Gundam Unicorn characters
 List of Mobile Suit Gundam AGE characters
 List of Gundam Build Fighters characters
 List of Gundam Reconguista in G characters
 List of Gundam Build Fighters Try characters
 List of Mobile Suit Gundam: Iron-Blooded Orphans characters
 List of Gundam Build Divers characters